François Boivin (born 8 December 1982) is a Canadian snowboarder who competed in snowboard cross. He has represented Canada at two Winter Olympic games, won a silver medal at a World Championships, and won three bronze medals in World Cup competitions.

Boivin was born in Jonquière, Quebec. He started snowboarding at the age of eight.  He has represented Canada at the 2006 Winter Olympics in Turin where he placed tenth, and at the 2010 Winter Olympics in Vancouver where he placed twelfth.  On the World Cup circuit, Boivin won bronze in 2004 at Berchtesgaden, 2005 at Sierra Nevada, and 2009 in La Molina.  At the 2005 World Championships, Boivin won a silver medal.

Boivin retired in 2012.

References

External links
 

1982 births
Living people
Canadian male snowboarders
Olympic snowboarders of Canada
Snowboarders at the 2006 Winter Olympics
Snowboarders at the 2010 Winter Olympics
Sportspeople from Saguenay, Quebec